Princess Margaretha of Sweden (Margaretha Sofia Lovisa Ingeborg; 25 June 1899 – 4 January 1977) was a member of the Swedish Royal Family by birth and the Danish Royal Family by marriage. She was the elder sister of Crown Princess Märtha of Norway and Queen Astrid of the Belgians.

Early life
Princess Margaretha was born on 25 June 1899 at her parents' summer residence, the Villa Parkudden, at Djurgården in Stockholm. The eldest child and daughter of Prince Carl, Duke of Västergötland, and Princess Ingeborg of Denmark, she was born Princess Margaretha of Sweden and Norway (later just "of Sweden", due to the dissolution of the union between Norway and Sweden in 1905).

In 1916 Margaretha's confirmation attracted enthusiastic press coverage; the event was said to mark the beginning of a new age for the Swedish royal house, which had lacked princesses for so long.

Marriage and family

On 22 May 1919, at the Storkyrkan, Stockholm, she was married to Prince Axel of Denmark, her maternal first cousin once removed. The marriage was a love match; her mother remarked that the couple were so much in love that they could not be left alone in a furnished room. Her wedding was celebrated with great festivities in Stockholm.

They had two sons:
 Prince George Valdemar Carl Axel of Denmark (16 April 1920 – 20 September 1986); married Anne Bowes-Lyon, niece of Queen Elizabeth of the United Kingdom (née Lady Elizabeth Bowes-Lyon), on 16 September 1950. 
 Prince Flemming Valdemar Carl Axel (9 March 1922 – 19 June 2002); married Alice Ruth Nielson, daughter of Kai Nielson and Edith Fischer, on 24 May 1949. They have four children, ten grandchildren and four great-grandchildren.

She was a maternal aunt of King Harald V of Norway and Kings Baudouin and Albert II of Belgium; and grandaunt of King Philippe of Belgium and Grand Duke Henri of Luxembourg.

Activities 
Margaretha adjusted herself well in Denmark, which she had often visited on family occasions during her upbringing. She lived a private life devoted to her family on the estate Bernstorffshøj in Gentofte and generally avoided publicity, and kept in close contact with her relations abroad. She was interested in social issues in Sweden, and became the patron of several charity organisations in Denmark, and was the chairperson of Gentofte Børnevenner.

She was a leading guest at the 1947 wedding of Princess Elizabeth and Philip, Duke of Edinburgh.

After the death of her sister Queen Astrid of Belgium in 1935, she became a great support for her sister's children in Belgium. Also after the death of her other sister, the Norwegian Crown Princess Märtha in 1954, she became a great support for her sister's children in Norway; she was the godmother of princess Märtha Louise of Norway.

Her spouse died in 1964. As a widow, she was often back in Sweden, where she would join other members of the Swedish royal house in representative duties at official ceremonies — most notably, the Nobel Prize. To her family, she was affectionately known as "Tante Ta" ("Aunt Ta").

She died in Kongsted, near Fakse, Denmark, in 1977.

Arms

Ancestry

References

Citations

Bibliography 

 
 
 

1899 births
1977 deaths
People from Stockholm
Margaret 1899
Norwegian princesses
Swedish people of French descent
House of Bernadotte
Danish princesses